Leaside High School (LHS) is a school of between 900 and 1000 pupils in central-east Toronto, Ontario, Canada, at the corner of Eglinton and Bayview Avenues. The school was established in 1945 by the Leaside Board of Education and is located in the Leaside neighbourhood.

Feeder schools for Leaside High School include Bessborough Public School, Bennington Heights Public School, Northlea Public School, and Rolph Road Public School.  The school houses the French immersion program from Cosburn Middle School and Northlea E.M.S, along with the Extended French program from Milne Valley Middle School, Cosburn Middle School, and Valley Park Middle School.

In late 2006, Leaside High was rated "Best Toronto School for Languages" by Toronto Life magazine, featuring courses in French, Spanish, Italian and others.

Notable alumni

 Will Arnett, actor
 Margaret Atwood, author
 Laura Bertram, actress
 Mike Bradwell,  former Canadian football wide receiver, Grey Cup champion
 Edwin, musician
 Terry Fallis, author
 Warren Hill, musician
 Jeff Jones, bass player
 Nathaniel G. Moore, author
 Brooke Nevin, actress
 Zach Edey, NCAA basketball (Purdue)

See also
List of high schools in Ontario

References

External links
Leaside High School

High schools in Toronto
Schools in the TDSB
Educational institutions established in 1945
1945 establishments in Ontario